Robert Essex may refer to:

Robert Devereux, 2nd Earl of Essex, favourite courtier of Elizabeth I of England
Robert Devereux, 3rd Earl of Essex, son of the above
Robert Capell, 10th Earl of Essex
Mark James Robert Essex, a spree-killer